Alderwood may refer to:
 Alderwood, Toronto, a neighbourhood within Toronto, Ontario, Canada
 Alderwood Mall, a regional shopping mall located in Lynnwood, Washington, United States
 Alderwood Manor, a CDP in Snohomish County, Washington, United States
 Alderwood, County Tyrone, a townland in County Tyrone, Northern Ireland
 Alderwood School, an all-through school in Aldershot in the UK
 Alderwood Middle School, a middle school in Lynnwood, Washington
 Marietta-Alderwood, Washington, a CDP in Whatcom County, Washington, United States

See also
 Alder (disambiguation)